"The Other Side" is a song performed by the American rock band Aerosmith, and written by Jim Vallance (music) and Steven Tyler (lyrics).  It was released on June 6, 1990 as the fourth single from the band's highly successful 1989 album Pump.

The songwriting team of Holland-Dozier-Holland were eventually given songwriting credit on the song after threatening to file suit over what they perceived to be similarities between "The Other Side" and their song "Standing in the Shadows of Love".

Music video
A music video was produced to promote the single. The video was directed by Marty Callner, and featured John Kalodner.  The video includes the intro piece "Dulcimer Stomp".

In popular culture
It was used in Tony Scott's 1993 film True Romance, with Christian Slater and Dennis Hopper.

Awards
The song won the MTV Video Music Award for Best Rock Video in 1991.

Track listing

Maxi-single

Radio single

Charts

See also
List of glam metal albums and songs

References

External links

Aerosmith songs
1990 singles
Music videos directed by Marty Callner
Songs written by Jim Vallance
Songs written by Holland–Dozier–Holland
Songs written by Steven Tyler
Song recordings produced by Bruce Fairbairn
Geffen Records singles
1989 songs
Glam metal songs